Nathaniel Attoh, alias Citizen Attoh, born (March 11, 1983) is a Ghanaian professional master of ceremonies (mc), international boxing ring announcer, and television and radio journalist. He is known for the radio show " Joy Sports Link" on Joy 99.7 FM (the flagship brand of the Multimedia Group) Ghana.

Early life and education 
The son of a physician, Attoh was born in Accra, Ghana.  He was educated at Ridge Church School in Accra., followed by St. Augustine's College in Cape Coast, Ghana.

He then received a diploma in communication studies from the African University College of Communications (then Africa Institute of Journalism and Communications) between 2003 and 2005. He later enrolled at the Ghana Institute of Journalism (GIJ), where he successfully completed a Bachelor of Arts degree in communication studies (PR option).

Broadcast career 
Attoh started his journalism career with the Graphic Communications Group, where he reported for the Graphic Sports Newspaper. After 5 years, he joined the Multimedia Group (Ghana) in April 2009 as a Broadcast Journalist (Sports). He was key in the establishment of the Joy Sports brand which now is on television, radio and online.

He was promoted to senior broadcast journalist and eventually editor of Joy Sports. He moved beyond sports, and presented some entertainment and lifestyle shows (Entertainment News on Drive Time on Joy FM and also "Autograph on the Joy Prime Channel on Multi TV"). He is the host of "Sports Today" on the Joy News Channel on Multi TV Ghana. He has also anchored the African Cup of Nations Broadcast, the Football Show and the English Premier League Broadcast, all on Multi TV Ghana.

Personal life
Attoh married Accra-based lawyer, Emelia Asiedu Attoh in July 2014; they have 2 children

Events hosted

Vodafone Ghana Music Awards 2015 Edition
Ghana Movie Awards 2011
Ghana Banking Awards 2015
CIMG (Chartered Institute of Marketing Ghana) Awards 2013
Sports Writers Association of Ghana (SWAG) Awards (5 Editions)
Ghana Journalists Association (GJA) Awards  (3 Editions including the 2015 Edition)
20th Anniversary Dinner of Golden Tulip Hotel, Ghana
Opening of UT Bank, Ghana 2009
60th Anniversary of GCB Bank (then Ghana Commercial Bank)
50th Anniversary Dinner and Awards of the National Lottery Authority
Guinness Football Challenge Ghana (Seasons I, II and III)
Rhythms On Da Runway.
Miss Universe Ghana
Host, Exclusive Men of the Year (EMY) Awards 2016.
Host, The Rhythms on DA Runway event, 2017.
Host Miss Universe Ghana, 2018.
Co host Rhythms on Da Runway.
Hosted The Spelling Bee Ghana, 2017,2020.

Achievements and nominations
Nominated, Glitz Style Awards 2016 Edition
Nominated, 2012 Radio and Television Personality Awards Ghana.
Nominated, 2016 Radio and Television Personality Awards Ghana.
Awarded, 2018 Glitz Africa Style Awards Media Personality of the year.

Modelling 
His first experience on the runway, was at the 2018 edition of the Joy Beauty and Bridal Fair, where he modeled suits and traditional marriage outfits and later at the 2019 Glitz Africa Fashion Week, in a design put together by Jay Ray Ghartey.

Boxing announcer
He has announced many big fight nights, including two IBO World Title fights: Joseph Agbeko VS Luis Melendez and a WBC World Youth World Title between Isaac Dogboe and John Neil Tabanao of the Philippines. He served as the Ring Announcer for the Judgement Day Bout between Ghana's Bukom Banku and Ayittey Powers, which was telecast on DSTV Super Sports to over 30 African Countries.
Nathaniel also served as the MC for the grand opening of the Bukom Boxing Arena of the Trust Sports Emporium.

References

External links 
 
 
 
 

1983 births
Living people
Ghanaian television journalists
People from Accra
Ghanaian radio journalists
Ridge Church School alumni
St. Augustine's College (Cape Coast) alumni
Ga-Adangbe people
Ghanaian Roman Catholics
Ghana Institute of Journalism alumni
Ghanaian sports journalists